The Bear Bluff Formation is a geologic formation in North Carolina. It preserves fossils dating back to the Neogene period.

See also

 List of fossiliferous stratigraphic units in North Carolina

References
 

Neogene geology of North Carolina
Neogene geology of South Carolina